Charlie Porter is a British fashion journalist.

As he could not afford to study fashion journalism at Central Saint Martins, Porter became a researcher for The Daily Express in the mid-1990s. He eventually became an arts reporter, as commissioning editor for The Times and arts editor for Esquire.  His first fashion-related post was as deputy fashion editor for The Guardian in 2000. Following this, Porter became an associate editor for GQ and deputy editor for the Amsterdam-based magazine Fantastic Man. By 2012, Porter had become a freelance journalist and also dedicated himself to fashion blogging. As of 2014, Porter writes for The Financial Times as their menswear critic. He has also contributed to i-D. He has been described as one of the most influential fashion journalists of his time.

As a representative of The Guardian and GQ, Porter was the journalist invited to choose the most representative looks for 2005 for the Fashion Museum, Bath's Dress of the Year collection. He chose a man's suit by Thom Browne and a green faille dress by Alber Elbaz for Lanvin.

References

Living people
British fashion journalists
British bloggers
1970s births
Place of birth missing (living people)
Year of birth uncertain